Magnus Norman defeated the defending champion Gustavo Kuerten in the final, 6–3, 4–6, 6–4, 6–4 to win the men's singles tennis title at the 2000 Italian Open.

Seeds

  Andre Agassi (third round)
  Yevgeny Kafelnikov (second round)
  Magnus Norman (champion)
  Gustavo Kuerten (final)
  Cédric Pioline (second round)
  Nicolás Lapentti (second round)
  Thomas Enqvist (third round)
  Tim Henman (second round)
  Lleyton Hewitt (semifinals)
  Álex Corretja (semifinals)
  Marcelo Ríos (first round)
  Patrick Rafter (first round)
  Greg Rusedski (first round)
  Younes El Aynaoui (third round)
  Dominik Hrbatý (quarterfinals)
  Juan Carlos Ferrero (third round)

Draw

Finals

Top half

Section 1

Section 2

Bottom half

Section 3

Section 4

External links
 ATP Singles draw

Italian Open - Singles, 2000
Men's Singles